"16th Avenue" is a song written by Thom Schuyler, and recorded by American country music artist Lacy J. Dalton. It was released in September 1982 as the second single and title track from the album 16th Avenue. The song reached number 7 on the Billboard Hot Country Singles & Tracks chart.

In 2007, the song was covered by Sunny Sweeney on her debut album Heartbreaker's Hall of Fame.

Content
Thom Schuyler said that after he wrote the song, he considered it "too much of an 'industry' kind of song" and had it filed away until a publisher asked if he had any new material. A song plugger then took it to producer Billy Sherrill, who produced Dalton's recording of it. Dalton also sang it at the opening of the 1982 Country Music Association awards telecast.

The location referred to in the song is Music Row in Nashville, which in the 1960s was being changed from residential homes to refurbished office space for the music industry.

Chart performance

References

1983 singles
1982 songs
Lacy J. Dalton songs
Sunny Sweeney songs
Songs written by Thom Schuyler
Song recordings produced by Billy Sherrill
Columbia Records singles
Songs about Tennessee